Phenyo Victor Mpitsang (born 28 March 1980) is a fast bowler who has played two One Day Internationals for South Africa in 1999. He has represented Free State and subsequently the Eagles franchise since 1998. On October 20, 2020, Cricket South Africa (CSA) announced that Victor Mpitsang has been appointed as the new National Convenor of Selectors. The position is a full-time appointment which will commence on 2 November 2020.

Early years

Mpitsang was born in Kimberley, Northern Cape, and was spotted as a youngster by Corrie van Zyl. A bursary was arranged for him as part of the UCB's development programme, enabling him to be educated at Grey College, Bloemfontein.

He played in three under-19 Test matches and eight under-19 ODIs in 1997 and 1998. He was a member of the South African squad for the 1998 Under-19 World Cup, taking seven wickets in five appearances at an average of 26.57, with best figures of 3/27 against India. His first-class debut for Free State came in the 1997–98 SuperSport Series when he was selected for the fixture against Border in East London.

International cricket

In January 1999, Mpitsang was named in the senior South African squad for the tour of New Zealand. According to Ray White, president of the UCB at the time, this decision was taken to "broaden his cricket experience and give him the benefit of touring with the national team". Following the announcement of the squad for New Zealand, he was given his senior debut in an ODI against the West Indies at Springbok Park, Bloemfontein. He opened the bowling and took 2/49, dismissing Nixon McLean and Daren Ganga with consecutive deliveries. He remains the youngest ODI debutant for South Africa at the age of 18 years and 314 days.

He did not feature in the international fixtures on the New Zealand tour, although he did play in the games against Northern Districts and New Zealand A. His next international opportunity came during the LG Cup in Kenya later in 1999, when he played against the host nation in Nairobi. He failed to take a wicket in his three overs on that occasion.

He has not been selected for the national side since then, although he has appeared for South Africa A against Sri Lanka A in 1999–2000 and also on a tour of the West Indies in 2000–01.

Domestic cricket

The 2000–01 season saw Mpitsang record both his best first-class bowling figures (5/24 against North West in Bloemfontein) and his highest first-class innings (23 against Western Province in Cape Town). He took a total of 33 first-class wickets during the course of that 2000–01 domestic season, a tally which he equalled in 2007–08.

In 2005–06, he was a member of the Eagles side that defeated the Cape Cobras in the final of the Standard Bank Pro20 series.

During the 2008 English season, he appeared as an overseas professional for Knypersley CC in Staffordshire.

Other achievements

Mpitsang has also played basketball for Free State.

References

External links

1980 births
Living people
Cricketers from Kimberley, Northern Cape
South African cricketers
South Africa One Day International cricketers
Free State cricketers
Knights cricketers
Alumni of Grey College, Bloemfontein